The 1930 Birmingham–Southern Panthers football team was an American football team that represented Birmingham–Southern College as a member of the Southern Intercollegiate Athletic Association (SIAA) during the 1930 college football season. In their third season under head coach Jenks Gillem, the team compiled a 5–4 record.

Schedule

References

Birmingham–Southern
Birmingham–Southern Panthers football seasons
Birmingham–Southern Panthers football